Founded in 2001, the American Council on Renewable Energy (ACORE) is a member-based, 501(c)(3) national non-profit organization that unites finance, policy and technology to accelerate the transition to a renewable energy economy.

ACORE's membership spans renewable energy technologies and constituencies, including developers, manufacturers, financial institutions, corporate end-users, grid technology providers, utilities, professional service firms, universities and other non-profit groups. ACORE's work revolves around convening leaders across key constituencies, facilitating partnerships, educating federal and state legislators and agency officials on important policies, publishing research and analysis on pressing issues, and undertaking strategic outreach on the policies and financial structures essential to renewable energy growth.

In 2011, retired vice admiral Dennis V. McGinn was named president and CEO of ACORE.  Under McGinn's leadership, ACORE's mission was updated to reflect the successes of the industry during ACORE's first decade. In July, 2013, McGinn was nominated by President Obama to serve as the Assistant Secretary of the Navy (Energy, Installations & Environment). ACORE's board of directors tapped board member Michael Brower to fill in as interim president and CEO. In January, 2014, the board voted for Brower to serve as the organization's full-time president and CEO. Brower retired in December, 2014  and Dan Reicher, chairman of the board of directors, served as interim president and CEO until Gregory Wetstone was named president and CEO in December 2015.

Programs
ACORE has two executive programs: 
The Partnership for Renewable Energy Finance (PREF) is a coalition of senior-level officials with companies that finance, develop, manufacture, and use renewable energy. PREF members focus on increasing capital formation and investment in renewable energy and educating the public sector to ensure that policy impacts the market as efficiently and effectively as possible.
The Partnership for Renewable Integration and Market Expansion (PRIME) is an invitation-only leadership program of prominent, multi-technology renewable energy companies, investors and corporate end-users that guide ACORE's strategic policy agenda.

Forums
ACORE organizes three major events each year, as well as an ongoing teleconference series.  These include:
Renewable Energy Policy Forum'': ACORE's Renewable Energy Policy Forum is a pan-technology renewable energy summit that addresses federal and state policy. It features discussions between industry leaders and key elected officials and offers  perspectives on the challenges and opportunities in the renewable energy industry.
Renewable Energy Finance Forum- Wall Street: REFF-Wall Street gathers senior investors, industry executives, and other top transactional professionals to assess the state of play for renewable energy finance in the context of policy uncertainty and continued market growth. The event is run in association with IJ Global (www.IJGlobal.com), a media and events outlet fully owned by Euromoney Trading Ltd. IJ Global owns the REFF brand and organises other associated events such as Reff LatAm, Reff Europe and Reff Asia.
Renewable Energy Grid Forum: ACORE's Renewable Energy Grid Forum convenes senior renewable energy executives, experts in the storage and technology sectors, system operators, financiers and corporate purchasers to maximize the use and integration of renewable energy in our nation's power markets.

See also

American Wind Energy Association
Solar Energy Industries Association
Energy conservation
Energy Information Administration
National Renewable Energy Laboratory
Renewable energy commercialization
Wind power in the United States

References

External links
 Official Site
 
 

Renewable energy organizations based in the United States